Morne Docteur is a town in Saint George Parish, Grenada.  It is located on the western coast of the island.

References 

Populated places in Grenada
Saint Andrew Parish, Grenada